Euxoa aurulenta, the dune cutworm, is a moth of the family Noctuidae. The species was first described by Smith in 1888. It is found in North America from Ontario west to Alberta and Washington, south to Illinois, Nebraska, Colorado and Arizona.

The wingspan is 35–39 mm. Adults are on wing in May to July. There is one generation per year.

The larvae probably feed on species of dune grass. In Michigan specimens have been collected in close proximity to the beach grasses Ammophila breviligulata and Calmovilfa longifolia.

References

"Euxoa aurulenta (Smith) dune cutworm". Michigan Natural Features Inventory. Retrieved November 15, 2020.

Euxoa
Moths of North America
Moths described in 1888